Tatiane Alves (born ) is a model, an accounting consultant, and a beauty queen, who represented Brazil in the eighth edition of the Miss Earth beauty pageant. She emerged as one of the winners and crowned as Miss Earth Fire, which is equivalent to third runner-up.

Miss Earth 2008

Alves, Miss Minas Gerais Universe 2005, and Miss Brazil Universe's fourth runner-up that year, was announced as Miss Earth Brazil 2008 during the election of Miss Minas Gerais Universe 2009, which took place in the city of Divinópolis last September 7, 2008. She started modeling at the age of 13.

In the final competition of the eighth edition of the international beauty pageant Miss Earth, Alves represented Brazil and was announced as one of sixteen semi-finalists who would move forward to compete for the title. She achieved one of the eight highest scores in the swimsuit competition for her stage chops, which advanced her as one of the top eight finalists to participate in the evening gown competition. She then pulled away for the lead as she articulated in her video interview about environmental concerns as a key issue in her country, in which she advanced to the top four.

In the last round, the court of four were asked one question, “What would you tell US president-elect Barack Obama about the state of the global environment if ever you were to meet him?” She placed fourth in the interview round and at the conclusion of the competition, she was crowned Miss Earth Fire.

This was the first time Brazil entered the top-4 of Miss Earth since Priscilla Meirelles in 2004. The Miss Earth pageant was held on November 9, 2008, at the Clark Expo Amphitheater in Angeles, Pampanga, Philippines. Eighty-five delegates arrived from October 19, 2008, in the Philippines. The pageant was broadcast live via ABS-CBN in the Philippines and to many countries worldwide via Star World, The Filipino Channel and other partner networks.

References

External links
Beleza Brasil Official Website
Miss Earth Official Website

1980s births
Living people
Miss Earth 2008 contestants
Brazilian female models
Brazilian beauty pageant winners